The 2018 Ladbrokes Players Championship Finals was the eleventh edition of the PDC darts tournament, which saw the top 64 players from the 22 Players Championship events of 2018 taking part. The tournament took place from 23 to 25 November 2018 at Butlin's Resort in Minehead.

Daryl Gurney won his 2nd major PDC title by defeating defending champion Michael van Gerwen 11–9, bringing an end to his 22-match winning streak in the competition.

Prize money
The 2018 Players Championship Finals had a total prize fund of £460,000, the same as 2017. The following is the breakdown of the fund:

Qualification
The top 64 players from the Players Championships Order of Merit, which is solely based on prize money won in the twenty-two Players Championships events during the season, qualified for the tournament:

On 20 November, Mensur Suljović withdrew from the tournament citing family reasons. Under the rules of the tournament, the next highest qualifier took his place, which happened to be Benito van de Pas, with no draw adjustments being made.

Top 64 in the Players Championship Order of Merit

Draw
There was no draw held, all players were put in a fixed bracket by their seeding positions.

Finals

Top half

Section 1

Section 2

Bottom half

Section 3

Section 4

References

Players Championship Finals
Players
Players
Minehead
Sports competitions in Somerset
2010s in Somerset
Players